Nathaniel Anthony Ayers, Jr. (born January 31, 1951) is an American musician. He is the subject of numerous newspaper columns, a book, and a 2009 film adaptation based on the columns. A foundation bearing his name was started in 2008 with an aim to support artistically gifted people with mental illness.

School and severe mental health crisis
Ayers began playing the double bass during middle school. He attended the Juilliard School in New York as a double bassist, but had a mental breakdown during his second year and was institutionalized. Ayers was one of the few black students at Juilliard at that time.

For some years he lived with his mother in Cleveland, Ohio, where he received electroconvulsive therapy for his illness to no avail. After his mother's death in 2000, he moved to Los Angeles, thinking that his father lived there. Homeless and debilitated with symptoms of schizophrenia, Ayers lived and played music on the streets.

The Soloist
Los Angeles Times columnist Steve Lopez met Ayers at Pershing Square in 2005, and discovered his background at Juilliard. Lopez wrote several columns about his relationship with Ayers, and Nathaniel's slow transition out of homelessness. Lopez's subsequent book, The Soloist: A Lost Dream, an Unlikely Friendship, and the Redemptive Power of Music, was based on his relationship with Ayers.

The book has been adapted into a film and a play titled The Soloist, released April 24, 2009 with Jamie Foxx and Robert Downey Jr. in the lead roles. In the film, Ayers is depicted as a cellist, rather than a bassist.

Ayers and Lopez's relationship was also nationally highlighted in the March 22, 2009 episode of 60 Minutes on CBS.

The Nathaniel Anthony Ayers Foundation
Ayers's sister, Jennifer Ayers-Moore, is the chairwoman and founder of the Nathaniel Anthony Ayers Foundation. The foundation, launched in 2008, began with Jennifer's desire to help what she and Nathaniel hope will be thousands of people. An endowment will be set up to continue their ability to keep the public awareness about mental health at the forefront of the nation's consciousness. The NAAF will facilitate the appreciation of the contributions that artistic expression make to the advancement of wellness and treatment, collaborate with mental health and arts organizations to identify and exhibit the work of the artistically gifted, and to provide for grants to worthy nonprofit organizations that embody the mission of the foundation.

References

External links
 TED Talk 'Robert Gupta: Music is medicine, music is sanity'

American classical violinists
Male classical violinists
American male violinists
American classical cellists
American classical double-bassists
Male double-bassists
People with schizophrenia
Outsider musicians
Musicians from Cleveland
Musicians from Los Angeles
1951 births
Living people
Homeless people
Classical musicians from California
Classical musicians from Ohio
21st-century classical violinists
21st-century double-bassists
21st-century American male musicians
21st-century African-American musicians
20th-century African-American people
21st-century American violinists
21st-century cellists